The Cannonball River is a tributary of the Missouri River, approximately  long, in southwestern North Dakota in the United States.

It rises in the Little Missouri National Grassland, in the badlands north of Amidon in northern Slope County. It flows ESE past New England, Mott, and Burt. It joins the Missouri in Lake Oahe near Cannon Ball. The cannonball concretions found in the vicinity of this river are the source of its name.

See also
List of rivers of North Dakota

References

Rivers of North Dakota
Tributaries of the Missouri River
Bodies of water of Slope County, North Dakota
Bodies of water of Sioux County, North Dakota